The Taming of the West, which had the working title of Sundown in Helldorado,  is a 1939 American Western film directed by Norman Deming, starring Wild Bill Elliott, and Iris Meredith.

Cast
 Wild Bill Elliott as Wild Bill Saunders
 Iris Meredith as Pepper
 Dick Curtis as Rawhide
 Dub Taylor as Cannonball
 James Craig as Handy
 Stanley Brown as Slim
 Ethan Allen as Judge Bailey
 Kenneth MacDonald as Carp Blaisdale
 Victor Wong as Cholly Wong
 Charles King as Jackson
 Lane Chandler as Turkey
 Art Mix as Blackie
 Richard Fiske as Blake
 John Tyrrell as Coleman
 Bob Woodward as Shifty
 Hank Bell as Marshall Bates

References

American Western (genre) films
American black-and-white films
1930s American films